Minnesota State Highway 105 (MN 105) is a  highway in southeast Minnesota, which runs from Mitchell County Road S70 at the Iowa state line and continues north to its northern terminus at its interchange with Interstate Highway 90 outside Austin.

Highway 105 passes through the communities of Lyle Township, Austin Township, and the city of Austin.

Route description
State Highway 105 serves as a north–south route between the Iowa state line and the city of Austin.

The route is located in Mower County.

Highway 105 is also known as 12th Street SW and Oakland Avenue W in the city of Austin.

The route parallels the Cedar River and U.S. Highway 218.

The route is legally defined as Route 199 in the Minnesota Statutes. It is not marked with this number.

History
State Highway 105 was authorized on April 22, 1933.

The route was paved by 1940.

From 1934 to 1980, the northern terminus of Highway 105 was previously at old U.S. 16 / old Minnesota 116 (Oakland Avenue) in Austin.  Minnesota 116 was turned back to city maintenance in 1980.  The 1.6 mile connecting route of old Minnesota 116 (Oakland Avenue) between Highway 105 at 12th Street and Interstate 90 on the western side of Austin was then added as an extension of 105 in 1980.

Highway 105 is currently a turnback candidate because of low traffic volume and it ends at a county road.

Major intersections

References

105
Transportation in Mower County, Minnesota